Suhandi (born 29 October 1991) is an Indonesian professional footballer who plays as a attacking midfielder for Liga 2 club Dewa United.

Club career

Badak Lampung
He was signed for Badak Lampung to play in Liga 1. Suhandi made his debut on 24 May 2019 in a match against PSM Makassar. On 23 September 2019, Suhandi scored his first goal for Badak Lampung against TIRA-Persikabo in the 45th minute at the Sumpah Pemuda Stadium, Bandar Lampung.

Honours

Club
PSMS Medan
 Liga 2 runner-up: 2017
Dewa United
 Liga 2 third place (play-offs): 2021

References

External links
 Suhandi at Flashscore
 Suhandi at Soccerway

1991 births
Living people
People from Bandung
Sportspeople from West Java
Sportspeople from Bandung
Indonesian footballers
PSMS Medan players
Persikabo 1973 players
PSS Sleman players
Badak Lampung F.C. players
BaBel United F.C. players
Muba Babel United F.C. players
Dewa United F.C. players
Liga 1 (Indonesia) players
Liga 2 (Indonesia) players
Association football midfielders